State Route 119 (SR 119) is a  south-to-north state highway completely in Henry County. The road begins at the Paris Landing State Park, at an intersection with US 79/SR 76. It ends at the Kentucky state line, northeast of Buchanan. There, the roadway continues as Kentucky Route 121.

Route description 

SR 119 begins on the banks of Kentucky Lake/Tennessee River at an intersection with US 79/SR 76 at Paris Landing State Park. It travels northward, closely paralleling the Kentucky Lake/Tennessee River as it passes by several lake related businesses before passing through wooded areas until it becomes KY 121 at the TN/KY state line.

Major intersections

See also 
List of state routes in Tennessee

References 

119
Transportation in Henry County, Tennessee